The 2009–10 St. Lawrence Saints women's hockey team represented St. Lawrence University in the 2009–10 NCAA Division I women's hockey season. The Saints were coached by Chris Wells and play their home games at Appleton Arena. The Big Red were a member of the Eastern College Athletic Conference and were unable to win the NCAA Women's Ice Hockey Championship

Offseason
April 21: Captains for the 2009–10 season have been appointed. Tara Akstull will be the Captain for the upcoming season. Courtney Sawchuk, Britni Smith and Brittony Chartier will each serve as assistant captains.
June 11: The Saints have added five players for the upcoming season. The five members of the Class of 2009 totaled 515 points in their time with the Saints. Kelly Sabatine, Kayla Sullivan, Jamie Goldsmith and Michelle Ng are the four new forwards that will comprise the class of 2013. Brooke Fernandez will join the incoming class on defence.
August 17: St. Lawrence senior defenseman Britni Smith, junior forward Karell Emard and former St. Lawrence standout Annie Guay have been named to Canada's National Under-22 Team
September 22:St. Lawrence, which has finished among the top three teams in the regular-season standings each year since 2000–01, has been selected to finish in first place in the ECAC in the preseason poll. The voting was done by the league coaches as part of the pre-season polls and all-league team. The Saints, garnered a total of 107 points, including three of 12 first-place votes. St. Lawrence, boasts returning all-league selection senior defender Britni Smith. Last season, the team finished second in the regular-season standings with a mark of 16-5-1.

Exhibition

Regular season
October 5: The St Lawrence women’s hockey team was ranked No. 5 in the country. The USCHO.com officials revealed it in their first Top-10 Women’s Hockey Poll of the season. St. Lawrence accumulated 71 points.
November 7: The 10th-ranked Harvard women's ice hockey team had a 3-0 shutout victory over No. 7 St. Lawrence at Bright Hockey Center. It was a historic match as the Crimson earned the program's 500th victory.
February 17: Britni Smith of St. Lawrence Univ. is among 45 nominees for the Patty Kazmaier Memorial Award.
Feb. 25: St. Lawrence University alumna Gina Kingsbury won her second Olympic gold medal as Canada's women's hockey team defeated the United States 2-0 in Vancouver.

Standings

Roster

Schedule

Game Highs

Player stats

Skaters

Goaltenders

Multiple-Point Games
Vanessa Emond, Britni Smith (9)
Kelly Sabatine (5)
Alley Bero, Michelle Ng (3)
Tara Akstull, Kayla Sullivan (2)
K. Shields, C. Sawchuk (1)

Awards and honors
Britni Smith, Pre-Season All-ECAC Team
Brittony Chartier, Frozen Four Skills Competition participant
Jamie Goldsmith, ECAC Rookie of the Week (Week of October 12)
Kelly Sabatine, ECAC Rookie of the Week (Week of October 19)
Britni Smith, Frozen Four Skills Competition participant
Kayla Sullivan, ECAC Rookie of the Week (Week of October 26)

See also
St. Lawrence Saints women's ice hockey
2009–10 NCAA Division I women's ice hockey season
2010–11 St. Lawrence Saints women's ice hockey season

References

External links
Official site

Saint Lawrence
St. Lawrence Saints women's ice hockey seasons